Insects as food or edible insects are insect species used for human consumption. More than 2,000 insects species worldwide are considered edible. However, a much smaller number is discussed for industrialized mass production and partly regionally authorized for use in food. Insects are commonly consumed whole or pulverized for use in dishes and processed food products such as burger patties, pasta, or snacks.

Edible insects

Frequently consumed insect species 
Estimates of numbers of edible insect species consumed globally range from 1,000 to 2,000. These species include 235 butterflies and moths, 344 beetles, 313 ants, bees and wasps, 239 grasshoppers, crickets and cockroaches, 39 termites, and 20 dragonflies, as well as cicadas. It is estimated that more than 2 billion people eat insects daily. Insect species consumption varies by region due to differences in environment, ecosystems, and climate. 

The table below lists the top five insect orders consumed by humans worldwide.

For a list of edible insects consumed locally see: List of edible insects by country.

Edible insects for industrialized mass production 
To increase consumer interest in Western markets such as Europe and North America, insects have been processed into a non‐recognizable form, such as powders or flour. Policymakers, academics, as well as large-scale insect food producers such as Entomofarms in Canada, Aspire Food Group in the United States, Protifarm and Protix in the Netherlands, and Bühler Group in Switzerland, focus on seven insects species suitable for human consumption as well as industrialized mass production:

 Mealworms (Tenebrio molitor) as larvae
 Lesser mealworms (Alphitobius diaperinus) as larvae, mostly marketed under the term buffalo worms.
 House cricket (Acheta domesticus)
 Tropical house cricket (Gryllodes sigillatus)
 European migratory locust (Locusta migratoria)
 Black soldier fly (Hermetia illucens)
 Housefly (Musca domestica)

Nutritional profile 

Insects are nutrient-efficient compared to other meat sources. Some insects (e.g. crickets, mealworms) are a source of complete protein and provide similar essential amino acid levels as soybeans, though less than casein. They have dietary fiber, essential minerals, vitamins such as  B12, riboflavin and vitamin A, and include mostly unsaturated fat.

Locusts contain between 8 and 20 milligrams of iron for every 100 grams of raw locust, whereas beef contains roughly 6 milligrams of iron in the same amount of meat. Crickets are also very efficient in terms of nutrients. For every 100 grams of substance crickets contain 12.9 grams of protein, 121 calories, and 5.5 grams of fat. Beef contains more protein containing 23.5 grams in 100 grams of substance, but also has roughly triple the calories and four times the amount of fat as crickets do in 100 grams.

Organoleptic characteristics 
The organoleptic characteristics of edible insects vary between species and are influenced by environment. For instance, aquatic edible insects such as water boatmen (family Corixidae) and dragonfly larvae have a fish flavor, while diving beetles taste like clams. Environment is not always a predictor of flavor, as terrestrial edible insects may also exhibit fish-like flavors (e.g. crickets, grasshoppers). Over 400 volatile compounds responsible for the aroma and flavor of edible insects have been identified. Pheromone chemicals contribute to pungent aromas and flavors in some species and the presence of organic acids (like formic acid in ants) makes some species taste sour. Organoleptic characteristics are dependent on the development stage of the insect (egg, larva, pupa, nymph, or adult) and may change significantly as an insect matures. For example, texture can change from soft to crunchy as an insect develops from larva to adult due to increasing exoskeletal chitin. Cooking method is considered the strongest influence on the final flavor of edible insects. Wet-cooking methods such as scalding or steaming, remove pheromones and odor compounds, resulting in a milder flavor, while dry-cooking methods such as frying and roasting, introduce more complex flavors.

The table below provides common flavor descriptors for a selection of edible insects. Flavors will vary with preparation method (e.g. raw, dried, fried, etc.). Insect development stage is provided when possible.

Farming, production, and processing 

Edible insects are raised as livestock in specialized insect farms. In North American as well as European countries such as the Netherlands or Belgium, insects are produced under strict food law and hygiene standard for human consumption.

Conditions such as temperature, humidity, feed, water sources, and housing, vary depending on the insect species. The insects are raised from eggs to larvae status (mealworms, lesser mealworms) or to their mature form (crickets, locusts) in industrialized insect farms and then killed via temperature control. Culled insects may be freeze-dried and packed whole, or pulverized to insect powder (insect flour) to be used in other food products such as baked goods or snacks.

In addition to nutritional composition and digestibility, insect species are selected for ease of rearing by the producer based on factors such as disease susceptibility, feed conversion efficiency, rate of development, and generational turnover.

Insect food products 
The following processed foods are produced in North America, Canada, and the EU:

 Insect flour: Pulverized, freeze-dried insects (e.g., cricket flour).
 Insect burger: Hamburger patties made from insect powder / insect flour (mainly from mealworms or from house cricket) and other ingredients.
 Insect fitness bars: Protein bars containing insect powder (mostly house crickets).
 Insect pasta: Pasta made of wheat flour, fortified with insect flour (house crickets or mealworms).
 Insect bread (Finnish Sirkkaleipä): Bread baked with insect flour (mostly house crickets).
 Insect snacks: Crisps, flips or small snacks (bites) made with insect powder and other ingredients.

Food and drink companies such as the Australian brewery Bentspoke Brewing Co and the South African startup Gourmet Grubb have introduced insect-based beer, a milk alternative, and insect ice cream.

Food safety 

Like other foods, the consumption of insects presents health risks stemming from biological, toxicological, and allergenic hazards. In general, insects harvested from the wild pose a greater risk than farmed insects, and insects consumed raw pose a greater risk than insects that are cooked before consumption. Feed substrate and growing conditions are the main factors influencing the microbiological and chemical hazards of farmed insects.

The table below combined the data from two studies published in Comprehensive Reviews in Food Science and Food Safety and summarized the potential hazards of the top five insect species consumed by humans.

The hazards identified in the above table can be controlled in various ways. Allergens can be labelled on the package to avoid consumption by allergy-susceptible consumers. Selective farming can be used to minimize chemical hazards, whereas microbial and parasitical hazards can be controlled by cooking processes.

As a further guarantee for consumers, quality labeling has been introduced by the Entotrust programme, an independent and voluntary product certification of insect-based foods, which allows producers to communicate the safety and sustainability of their activities.

Challenges 
There are challenges associated with the production, processing, and consumption of insects as food.

Production 
Mass production in the insect industry is a concern due to a lack of technology and funds to efficiently harvest and produce insects. The machinery would have to house proper enclosure for each life cycle of the insect as well as the temperature control as that is key for insect development.

Processing 
The availability of wild-harvested insects can be seasonally dependent. This presents a challenge, as many wild-harvested insects have a short shelf life, sometimes of only a day or two. Identifying methods of processing and storing that extend the shelf life of seasonal insects will improve the efficiency of their harvest and consumption.

Regulation and authorisation

EU 
In the European Union, edible insects – whole or in parts, e.g., legs, wings, or heads – fall within the definition of novel food, given by the European Commission. Dossiers for several insect species are currently under review by the European Food Safety Authority. 

In August 2018, EFSA published a first risk profile for the house cricket as food. According to a risk assessment published by EFSA on 13 January 2021, the yellow mealworm is safe for human consumption. On 2 July 2021, EFSA published another scientific opinion stating that migratory locust in frozen, dried or ground state is safe for human consumption. On 17 August 2021, EFSA published a safety assessment with view to house crickets (Acheta domesticus) stating that frozen and dried formulations from whole house crickets are safe for consumption. On 4 July 2022, EFSA published an opinion confirming the safety of frozen and freeze-dried formulations of the lesser mealworm (Alphitobius diaperinus in larval state) for human consumption.

Following EFSA's assessment, the European Commission has authorized the following edible insects as novel food in the EU:
 Dried Tenebrio molitor larvae (mealworms) with the Commission Implementing Regulation (EU) 2021/882 of 1 June 2021 (in force on 22 June 2021).
 Frozen, dried and powdered forms of migratory locust (Locusta migratoria) with the Commission Implementing Regulation (EU) 2021/1975 of 12 November 2021 (in force on 5 December 2021). 
 Frozen, dried and powdered forms of house cricket (Acheta domesticus) with the Commission Implementing Regulation (EU) 2022/188 of 10 February 2022.
 Frozen, paste, dried and powder forms of lesser mealworm larvae (Alphitobius diaperinus) with the Commission Implementing Regulation (EU) 2023/58 of 5 January 2023.

Switzerland 
On 1 May 2017, Switzerland approved the following insect species as food:
 House cricket (Acheta domesticus)
 European locust (Locusta migratoria)
 Mealworms (Tenebrio molitor as larvae)
Under certain conditions, these may be offered to consumers whole, pulverized, or processed in food products.

UK 
After the Brexit transition period, the regulation regarding edible insects changed in the United Kingdom on 21 January 2021, making them non-marketable without authorization. Insect food products that had been on the market had to be recalled. Insect food products have to be authorized by the Food Standards Agency (FSA) in a novel food authorization process. In February 2022, UK insect industry association Woven Network CIC submitted a first dossier for the authorization of house crickets  (Acheta domesticus) as novel food to the FSA.

USA and Canada 
In the USA and Canada, insects for human consumption are not classified as novel food and the import and sale is permitted. In the US, insect food products must comply with FDA standards and food labelling regulations (including allergy risk labelling).

Within the Federal Food, Drug, and Cosmetic Act (FD&C Act), the FDA states that "The term 'food' means (1) articles used for food or drink for man or other animals, (2) chewing gum, and (3) articles used for components of any such article." Thus, with insects falling under said category, they must be safe and may not bear any added poisonous or added deleterious substance that is unsafe. Said items may not be prepared, packed, or held under insanitary conditions, and must be produced in accordance with current Good Manufacturing Practice (GMP), regulations for manufacturing/processing, packing, or holding human food. The FD&C Act also includes requirements that pertain to the labeling of food and preventive controls, as applicable. Manufacturers have a responsibility to ensure that the food they produce for the United States market is safe and complies with the FD&C Act and FDA's implementing regulations.

In Canada, insects are subject to the same standards and guidelines as other foods sold in stores or online.

Awareness 
World Edible Insect Day, held on 23 October, was introduced by Belgian entrepreneur Chris Derudder in 2015 to raise awareness globally for the consumption of edible insects, with a focus on Europe, North America, and Australia.

See also 
Insects as feed
Insect-based pet food
List of edible insects by country

Footnotes

External links 

 FAO: Insects for food and feed
 European Food Safety Authority: Risk profile related to production and consumption of insects as food and feed
 Nova documentary "Edible Insects"

Further reading 
 FAO (2021): Looking at edible insects from a food safety perspective. Challenges and opportunities for the sector. Rome. doi: https://doi.org/10.4060/cb4094en
 
 
 
 Calder, Daniel. The Dietitian's Guide to Eating Bugs 2013 ebook  
 

 
Insects in culture